Tripseuxoa is a genus of moths of the family Noctuidae.

Selected species
Tripseuxoa deeringi Schaus, 1929
Tripseuxoa strigata Hampson, 1903

References
Natural History Museum Lepidoptera genus database
Noctuídeos (Lepidoptera, Noctuidae) Do Museu Entomológico Ceslau Biezanko, Departamento De Fitossanidade, Faculdade De Agronomia “Eliseu Maciel”, Universidade Federal De Pelotas, RS

Noctuinae